The 1993 Individual Speedway World Championship was the 48th edition of the official World Championship to determine the world champion rider.

"Sudden" Sam Ermolenko of the United States won his only Speedway World Championship to become the first American winner since Bruce Penhall in 1982. Triple World Champion Hans Nielsen finished second with England's Chris Louis finishing third.

Qualification

Australian Qualification

Australian Final
 January 30, 1993
  Brisbane, Brisbane Exhibition Ground
 First 4 to Commonwealth Final plus 1 reserve

New Zealand Qualification

New Zealand Final
 Mart 31, 1993
  Christchurch, Ruapuna Speedway
 First 2 to Commonwealth Final

British Qualification

British Final
 May 9, 1993
  Coventry, Brandon Stadium
 First 10 to Commonwealth Final plus 1 reserve

Swedish Qualification

Swedish Final
 May 11, 12 & 13, 1993
  - 3 Rounds (Mariestad, Norrköping and Hallstavik)
 First 5 to Nordic Final plus 1 reserve

Danish qualification

Danish Final
 May 29, 1993, and May 31, 1993
  - 2 Rounds (Randers & Fjelsted)
 First 5 to Nordic Final plus 1 reserve
 Gert Handberg seeded to Nordic Final

Intercontinental Round

Commonwealth Final
 May 23, 1993
  King's Lynn, Norfolk Arena
 First 11 to Overseas Final plus 1 reserve

* Mitch Shirra replaced Mark Lyndon

Overseas Final
 June 13, 1993
  Coventry, Brandon Stadium
 First 9 plus 1 reserve to World Semi-final

Nordic Final
 June 13, 1993
  Seinäjoki
 First 9 plus 1 reserve to World Semi-final

Continental Round

World Semifinals

Semifinal 1
 July 24, 1993
  Lonigo, Pista Speedway
 First 8 to World Final plus 1 reserve

Semifinal 2
 August 6, 1993
  Vetlanda, Vetlanda Speedway
 First 8 to World Final plus 1 reserve

World Final
August 29, 1993 
 Pocking, Rottalstadion

References

1993
World Individual